The Archambault A40, or Archambault 40, is a French sailboat that was designed by Joubert Nivelt Design as a cruiser-racer and first built in 2004.

Production
The design was built by Archambault Boats of Dangé-Saint-Romain, France, starting in 2004, but it is now out of production.

Design
The Archambault A40 is a recreational keelboat, built predominantly of fibreglass. It has a fractional sloop rig. The hull has a plumb stem, an open reverse transom, an internally mounted spade-type rudder controlled by a wheel and a fixed fin keel.

The design has sleeping accommodation for eight people, with a double "V"-berth in the bow cabin, two straight settees in the main cabin with a drop leaf table and two aft cabins, each with a double berth. The galley is located on the port side just forward of the companionway ladder. The galley is "L"-shaped and is equipped with a two-burner stove, a  icebox and a sink. A navigation station is opposite the galley, on the starboard side. The head is located just aft of the bow cabin on the starboard side and has a shower.

For sailing downwind the design may be equipped with a symmetrical spinnaker.

Operational history
A review in Yacht and Boat described sailing the design, "the boat is astonishingly easy to control. The steering does not load up at any time; to a degree, steering is an intellectual exercise, not a tactile one. By that I mean that when Glenn calls “pressure coming” and I wait for the helm to tell me that the boat feels the extra breeze, nothing happens. She simply accelerates in a straight line, with no need to wind off helm. It may be a different story in a sea and with tougher gusts; we had smooth seas, but there is never an acute angle of heel, or sudden lurch that upsets the crew. It's a terrible cliche, but this hull really, really is like a big dinghy."

See also
List of sailing boat types

References

Keelboats
2000s sailboat type designs
Sailing yachts
Sailboat type designs by Joubert-Nivelt
Sailboat types built by Archambault Boats